"Wishing" is a song by American hip hop record producer DJ Drama. It was released as a digital download on May 2, 2016, as the lead single from fifth studio album Quality Street Music 2 (2016). The song features guest vocals from American singer and rapper  Chris Brown, and American rappers Skeme and LyQuin. The song contains a sample of the song "Disrespectful" by Trey Songz and Mila J from his sixth studio album Trigga (2014).

Music video
On May 26, 2016, DJ Drama uploaded the music video for "Wishing", directed by Eavvon O'Neal, on his YouTube and Vevo account. The music video features a cameo appearance from 50 Cent.

Remix
On September 28, 2016, a remix was released that featured DJ Drama, Chris Brown, Fabolous, Trey Songz, Tory Lanez and Jhené Aiko.

Charts
"Wishing" peaked at number 77 on the Billboard Hot 100, becoming DJ Drama's highest-charting single.

Weekly charts

Year-end charts

Certifications

Release history

References 

2016 singles
2016 songs
DJ Drama songs
Chris Brown songs
Songs written by Chris Brown
MNRK Music Group singles